Double Toasted is an entertainment website based in Austin, Texas. The site hosts weekly podcasts covering current events, pop culture, movie reviews and video games.

History 

After the closure of Spill.com in 2013, Korey Coleman was encouraged by friends and fans to create a Kickstarter campaign to fund a new home for his content.

The original goal was set at $30,000. During the campaign, Coleman and Martin Thomas continued to podcast and update fans on the growing total. On the last night, they held a 24-hour live stream with guests and fans stopping by for support. At the end of the stream, the final amount given was $133,860.

As a result, doubletoasted.com was created, and launched on July 2, 2014.

On October 17, 2019, in a video posted on the site's YouTube page, it was announced that Double Toasted would move to Twitch in November, in a deal that would have the site's main shows move to the platform, with the exception of other content, that would continue to be on the site.

Podcasts and segments 

Unlike Spill.com, Double Toasted features both audio and video for every show. Since the site's launch in July 2014, there have been several podcasts started - each with a different cast.

The Sunday Service 

Korey Coleman and Martin Thomas sit down for some free-form conversation, the weekend box office, a recap of the week's highlighted stories, and take emails and calls from the audience.

The show occasionally features interviews and appearances from members of the community, a.k.a. 'Toasties'.

Notable guests include:
 Steve-O
 C. Robert Cargill
 Andre Meadows
 Jackie Venson
 Mark Ellis of Schmoes Know

What Up, Son! 

Korey Coleman, Oz Greene Jr., who skypes from New York (although he does appear in person a couple of times whenever he is in town), and Korey's wife, Miss Mia, host this segment. The three talk about the "Free Form Foolishness" in the world and diverge into a variety of topics mixed with casual conversation. The show was initially an audio-only show, but has since moved to video.

Notable guest:
 Alan Ssali Hofmanis of Ramon Film Productions

The Weekly Roast and Toast 

Korey Coleman, Martin Thomas and (sometimes) Billy Brooks review older bad movies which are chosen every week by viewers based on a poll. Additionally, they will sometimes look at the latest trailers released and discuss other stories.

Notable guest:
 Correll Bufford

The Movie Review Extravaganza 

Korey Coleman and Martin Thomas share their opinions on the latest releases. Occasionally they will bring a guest to help review the film. The show's introductory song is "Revolution World Crazy" by Panacea. The show initially had a game segment when it first started called 'Martin gets a gold star!' where people had a chance to win a prize. They faded this portion out.

8-Bit Crumbs 

Korey Coleman and Chris Herman discuss video game news and entertainment stories, review games and movies, and answer fan questions on Double Toasted's Twitch show. They also occasionally play games.

Rating system:

After giving their thoughts on the movie, each critic gives a rating based on how much of your time and money are worth spending on it. Each rating can have a high/low variation. Note that there have been many times where a movie will get vastly different reviews based on the reviewer. The ratings are the same ones carried over from Spill.com. From highest to lowest, they are:

Once the review has been posted on the site, members of the community can give a one to five star rating, depending on what they thought of the film.

DT Interviews 
Korey also hosts interview segments separate from the other shows.
 Ricardo González, Michael Guasch and Toni Calderon from The Gentleman Driver
 Mary Lynn Rajskub
 Steve Johnson
 Xavier Neal-Burgin
 Lisa Henson (episode was not aired live at the request of Henson)
 Jhonen Vasquez
 Keith David
 Alexandre O. Philippe
 William Conlin
 Andrew Shea
 Sergio Pablos
 Sam Sawyer creator of S.A.L.E.M.
 Jerry Minor
 Rob Paulsen
 Bruce W. Smith
 J.D. and Pilar Witherspoon.
 Chris Stuckmann
 Doug Walker
 James Rolfe

Former shows

The Casual Call-In Show 

Korey Coleman, Danielle Dallaire and Ray Villarreal answered fan questions through phone calls, Skype and emails. The show was initially released every Monday, but ceased in February 2017 due to low viewership.

The Spoiler Show 

William Valle discussed movies in depth. Korey Coleman was featured as a guest, but after one episode, which was heavily criticized, the show was immediately terminated.

The Double Dribble 

Ray Villareal and co-host Chase Arthur discussed sports and other extracurricular activities in a free-form discussion. The show was canceled in June 2017 when Chase left the site and Ray chose not to continue it.
Special guest includes:
 Mia Khalifa (multiple occasions)

The High Score 

Korey Goodwin and T.J. Manatsa (formally Patrick Girts) discussed the latest video game news, followed by a playthrough of games chosen by the community. The show was released every Saturday and had its last show on May 26, 2018.

Toast to Toast 

William Valle hosted a short form talk show where he focused on a specific topic related to politics, social issues, or popular culture. He also features a special guest, usually someone from the crew, every episode. The show was released every other Friday. It was canceled because Valle felt the show was repetitive to the already existing shows. Valle would later bring Toast to Toast's format to a new show called Night Class on his own website Camel Moon.

Sammy Ain't Seen Sh*t 

A spin-off segment from the Weekly Roast and Toast. This segment focuses on film school graduate Sammy González, who along with Chris Herman (formally Ian Butcher), take a look at important or classic films that they had not seen until recently. The show was released every Thursday. It ended after Sammy had to leave the site, due to President Trump's new immigration laws.

What's in the Box 

DJ Milez and Comic book writer, Christian Torres talk about television shows and dive into TV and other related news. The show abruptly came to an end on August 8, 2019.

The Daily Double Talk 

Korey Coleman and Christian Torres talk about news in entertainment. Originally an audio only podcast with Korey and Tommy.

Cast

Former co-hosts include:
Tommy McGrew – The first regular co-host to be added to the show after the closing of Spill.com. McGrew has not appeared on the site since 2016 when he was involved in a fatal hit and run accident, killing a pedestrian. Despite being a "hit and run," Tommy did eventually returned to the scene later to realized he had hit a person and not an animal (as he originally thought). Besides the initial update to Tommy's situation in mid 2016, Korey Coleman, and the rest of the Double Toasted crew have refrained from mentioning his name on the site, similar to the WWE with Chris Benoit. Korey has stated only once, after getting many emails about Tommy's return to the site, that the chances of McGrew returning to the site is highly unlikely. However, Tommy made a surprise appearance on a February 2019 show where he revealed that he did not get any jail time, but is on probation for ten years and had to seek therapy to help cope with the fact that he killed someone. He says that after 10 years of good behavior, he will be given a clean slate.  He has expressed interest in returning, but Korey confirmed that it would be impossible for things to go back to the way it was.
Patrick Girts – Former co-host on the High Score, The Movie Review Extravaganza and The Weekly Roast and Toast. Girts chose to leave due to the stresses of working on three shows late at night and wanting to focus on a career in marketing. He still makes occasional appearances and is the usually the subject of Korey's numerous diatribes.
Danielle Dallaire – Former co-host on What Up Son and occasionally co-hosted on various shows. She left to pursue other opportunities. Though Danielle had initially claimed that it would only be for a year, Korey Coleman has openly doubted it with Danielle confirming that it was a long term job. Her final show was on May 14, 2018. In mid-2021, Danielle returned, seemingly as a regular and began to appear more often. On November 9, 2021, Korey announced that he banned her from the show due to her behavior.
Korey Goodwin – Former host of The High Score and co-host on The Weekly Roast and Toast and The Movie Review Extravaganza. He can speak Mandarin. His final show was on June 13, 2018. He left to go focus on his own personal career. He still makes occasional appearances.
Sam "Sammy" González – Former editor and regulator of the fan pages. Host on Sammy Ain't Seen Sh*t. Occasional co-host on various shows. He left to pursue other interests. His final show was on April 28, 2019. He still makes occasional appearances.
Ian Butcher – Former co-host on Sammy Ain't Seen Sh*t and Toast to Toast.
Taylor "Kung-Fu T.J." Manatsa – Former co-host on The High Score. He still makes occasional appearances.
Chase Arthur – Former co-host of the Double Dribble.
Ray Villareal – Also known as rapper "Tone Royal", former co-host of the Double Dribble. He still makes occasional appearances.
William Valle – Former editor and contributor for the site. Occasional co-host on various shows. He talked about controversial topics. He still makes occasional appearances.
Shea Young – The first female cast member added to the site. Shea left in February 2016 to pursue other opportunities, and because of negative fan reaction to her. She is the only former member who have not made an appearance after leaving the site. Her current location is unknown.
Robert "DJ Milez" Araya – Former co-host on What's in the Box.
Christian Torres - Former Co-host on The Daily Double Talk, former co-host on What's in the Box. Author of comic, Here We Are Lost.

Awards and recognition 

The site has been nominated for several awards, and won The Austin Chronicle Best of Austin 2015: Best Podcast.

References

External link 
 
 

Podcasting companies
American entertainment news websites
Internet properties established in 2014